Davin Joseph (born November 22, 1983) is a former American football guard.  He played college football for the University of Oklahoma, and was drafted by the Tampa Bay Buccaneers in the first round (23rd overall) in the 2006 NFL Draft. A two-time Pro Bowler, he also played for the St. Louis Rams.

Early years
Joseph was born in Hallandale, Florida, and is of Haitian descent. He played high school football at Hallandale High School.  While there he was a four-year starter at both guard and defensive line and played in a school-record 532 plays. During his senior year, he was the Broward County Defensive Player of the Year and was awarded All-State after recording 100 tackles and 24 sacks. He was also a two-time 2A state and a national wrestling champion at heavyweight in Florida.

College career
Joseph played college football at Oklahoma. During his freshman year, he was named Freshman All-Big 12 by The Sporting News. As a senior, he was a consensus First-team All-Big 12 selection. He finished his career playing in 50 games with 29 starts at guard and 11 starts at left tackle.

Professional career

Tampa Bay Buccaneers 

Joseph was drafted by the Tampa Bay Buccaneers 23rd overall in the 2006 NFL Draft. During his rookie season, he started 12 of 13 games at right guard. In his second season in the NFL he became a full-time starter, starting all 16 games at right guard for the buccaneers. He was selected to his first Pro Bowl after the 2008 season as a substitute. On July 28, 2011, Joseph agreed to terms with the "Bucs" on a seven-year, $53 million contract including $19 million guaranteed.
He was selected to his second Pro Bowl during the 2011 season.

In the third preseason game against the New England Patriots in 2012, Joseph hurt his knee when teammate Donald Penn blocked defensive end Chandler Jones into his knee. Joseph was later placed on injured reserve, ending his season.

Joseph was released by Tampa Bay on March 8, 2014.

St. Louis Rams
Joseph signed with the St. Louis Rams on May 28, 2014.

Philanthropy
In 2011, Davin Joseph established the Davin Joseph Foundation, a 501(c)(3) organization devoted to enhancing the athletic and performing arts programs in three Title-One public schools in Tampa and Hallandale, Florida, respectively.

Awards
Davin Joseph has won several awards such as:
 2015 Rainbow Push Community Service Award
 Induction in the Broward County Athletic Association Wrestling Hall of Fame (2013)
 Byron "Whizzer" White Award (2012)
 City of Hallandale Beach, Florida, and its mayor proclaimed July 12–14 forever recognized as Davin Joseph Football Week (2012)
 Featuring on Fox13, Tampa's local news station for "What's Good in Tampa Bay?" segment (2012)
 Cover story in Focus Magazine, recognizing his commitment to the community of Tampa, Florida (2011)

References

External links

 Tampa Bay Buccaneers bio
 St. Louis Rams bio

1983 births
Living people
American football offensive guards
American sportspeople of Haitian descent
Hallandale High School alumni
National Conference Pro Bowl players
Oklahoma Sooners football players
People from Hallandale Beach, Florida
Players of American football from Florida
St. Louis Rams players
Tampa Bay Buccaneers players
Sportspeople from Broward County, Florida
Ed Block Courage Award recipients